Mycena nebula is a species of fungus belonging to the Mycena genus. It was discovered in Veracruz in Mexico growing on moss-covered bark on living trees. It was documented in 2019 by A. Cortés-Pérez, Desjardin, and A. Rockefeller.

Description 
The cap is 3–9 mm (0.1-0.35 in) in diameter and initially a broad conical shape, expanding to become convex or umbonate. The cap is moist and glabrous and the color ranges from pale pink to red. When cut or bruised, a dark red latex is released. The gills are adnate to adnate with a decurrent tooth, distant, and white to pale pink. The stipe is central, cylindrical, hollow, and has a slightly swollen base. The stipe color ranges from red to translucent pink and releases a dark red latex when cut. The basidiome is bioluminescent and gives off a bright green light. The odor and edibility is unknown.

References 

nebula
Fungi described in 2019
Fungi of Mexico
Fungi without expected TNC conservation status